The Promise of a Future is the eighth studio album by South African jazz musician Hugh Masekela released via Uni Records label. It was recorded in March 1968 in Los Angeles, California. The album was re-released on CD in 1993 on One Way label.  The Promise of a Future features Masekela's version of a famous instrumental composition "Grazing in the Grass".

Reception
A reviewer of Dusty Groove stated: "Classic work from Hugh Masekela – and the album that pushed him over the top! The record features his version of 'Grazin In The Grass', a runaway instrumental hit when it was issued – and a sly little groover that was based upon some earlier South African pop melodies that Hugh copped from his roots. The group's a tight little quintet with Al Abreu on tenor and soprano sax, William Henderson on piano, Chuck Carter on drums, and Henry Franklin on bass." A reviewer of Billboard added: "Fluent in any musical lingo, Masekela and his crowd should sample all the charts before settling down."

Track listing

Personnel
Bass – Henry Franklin
Drums – Chuck Carter
Guitar – Bruce Langhorne
Engineer – The Doctor
Piano – William Henderson
Producer – Stewart Levine
Saxophone (tenor, soprano) – Al Abreu
Trumpet (uncredited) – Hugh Masekela

References

External links

1968 albums
Uni Records albums
Hugh Masekela albums
Albums produced by Stewart Levine
Albums recorded at Gold Star Studios